The Italian Embassy in Washington, D.C. is the diplomatic mission of the Italian Republic to the United States, and the seat of the Italian Ambassador to the United States.

The original Italian diplomatic mission to the United States following Italian unification was founded by Baron Saverio Fava. The current chancery is located just off Embassy Row at 3000 Whitehaven Street, Northwest, Washington, D.C.  In 1972, the Italian government purchased property from the Andrew W. Mellon Foundation that was part of the campus of the neighboring Center for Hellenic Studies.

The new building was designed by Piero Sartogo Architetti and was constructed in 1996.

Old Embassy

Previously the embassy had been based at 2700 16th Street and Fuller Street, in an ornate and historic, but small, facility. Several of the embassy's offices had to be based elsewhere in Washington, and it was thus decided to build a new chancery.

The Neo-Renaissance building was completed in 1925 and was designed by architects Warren and Wetmore (their designs include Grand Central Terminal in New York City). The first Italian ambassador to reside in the home was Giacomo De Martino. In 1977, Ambassador Roberto Gaja moved the residence to Villa Firenze (Firenze House) in the Forest Hills neighborhood. The 16th Street building continued to serve as the chancery until 2002, when it was purchased by developers. Their plans to convert the building into condominiums are being challenged by the city's Historic Preservation Office.

Bibliography 
  As described in

See also
Foreign relations of Italy
Italian nationality law
List of ambassadors of Italy to the United States

External links

Embassy of Italy in Washington 
wikimapia

Italy
Washington, D.C.
Government buildings completed in 1996
1990s architecture in the United States
Italy–United States relations
Italy